"English Sunset" is the only single released by The Moody Blues from their 1999 album Strange Times, making it their first single in nearly 8 years.  "English Sunset" should not be confused with the Moody Blues' 1967 song "The Sunset" from Days of Future Passed.

Personnel
 Justin Hayward: lead vocals, electric guitar
 John Lodge: vocals, bass guitar
 Ray Thomas: vocals, tambourine
 Graeme Edge: drums, percussion

Additional Personnel
 Danilo Madonia: keyboards, orchestration

External links
 "English Sunset" being performed at Royal Albert Hall (YouTube)"

The Moody Blues songs
1999 singles
Songs written by Justin Hayward
1999 songs
Universal Records singles